List of United States Air Force air divisions is a comprehensive and consolidated list of USAF Air Divisions.

Air Divisions 1–15
1st Strategic Aerospace Division
 Air Division, Provisional, 1 1962–1963 Homestead Air Force Base Cuban Missile Crisis
2nd Air Division
 Air Division, Provisional, 2 1962–1963 McCoy Air Force Base Cuban Missile Crisis
3rd Air Division
 3rd Air Division, Provisional July–Aug 48  RAF Marham
 Air Division, Provisional, 3 1962–1963 MacDill Air Force Base Cuban Missile Crisis
4th Air Division
5th Air Division
6th Air Division
7th Air Division
8th Air Division
9th Space Division
10th Air Division
11th Air Division
12th Air Division
13th Strategic Missile Division
14th Air Division
14th Air Division (Provisional)
15th Air Division (Provisional)

Air Divisions 16–30
17th Air Division
 Air Division, Provisional, 17	1972–1975 U Tapao RTAB Operation Arc Light
17th Air Division (Provisional)
18th Strategic Aerospace Division
19th Air Division
20th Air Division
21st Air Division
22d Strategic Aerospace Division
23d Air Division
24th Air Division
25th Air Division
26th Air Division
27th Air Division
28th Air Division
29th Air Division
30th Air Division

Air Divisions 31–45
31st Air Division
32d Air Division
33d Air Division
34th Air Division
35th Air Division
36th Air Division
37th Air Division
38th Air Division
39th Air Division
40th Air Division
41st Air Division
42d Air Division
43d Air Division
44th Air Division
45th Air Division

Air Divisions 46–100
47th Air Division
49th Air Division
50th Air Division
57th Air Division
 Air Division, Provisional, 57	1972–1973 Andersen AFB Operation Arc Light
58th Air Division
64th Air Division
65th Air Division
69th Air Division
73d Air Division
76th Air Division
85th Air Division
86th Air Division
90th Air Division
91st Air Division
96th Air Division
100th Air Division

Air Divisions 101–500
 301st Fighter Division, Provisional Aug–Sep 1948 Okinawa
302d Air Division
304th Air Division
305th Air Division
307th Air Division
309th Air Division
310th Air Division
311th Air Division
313th Air Division
314th Air Division
315th Air Division
316th Air Division
322d Air Division
323d Air Division
325th Air Division
326th Air Division
327th Air Division

Air Divisions 501–999
552d Airborne Warning and Control Division
801st Air Division
802d Air Division
806th Air Division
810th Strategic Aerospace Division
 Air Division, Provisional, 810 1972–1973 Minot AFB (organizational test)
813th Strategic Aerospace Division
 Air Division, Provisional, 813 June–July 54 Pinecastle AFB
816th Strategic Aerospace Division
817th Air Division
818th Strategic Aerospace Division
819th Strategic Aerospace Division
820th Strategic Aerospace Division
821st Strategic Aerospace Division
822d Air Division
823d Air Division
825th Strategic Aerospace Division
830th Air Division
831st Air Division
832d Air Division
833d Air Division
834th Air Division
835th Air Division
836th Air Division
837th Air Division
838th Air Division
839th Air Division
840th Air Division

Air Divisions 1000+
1610th Air Division (Provisional)
4310th Air Division
 Air Division, Provisional, 4400 1965–1966 Mountain Home AFB
 Air Division, Provisional, 4481 Jan–Jul 1964 England AFB
7217th Air Division
 7749th Air Division, Provisional Jul–Sep 1948 Camp Lindsey, Germany

Air Divisions, named
 Air Division, Reserve, Provisional Oct–Nov 1958 Donaldson AFB (exercise command unit)
 Antilles Air Division 1948–1949 Ramey Air Force Base, PR
 Pine Cone Air Division Mar–Jul 1959 Shaw AFB (exercise command unit)
USAF Southern Air Division
 Yukon Air Division Apr–Jun 1948 Ladd AFB

External links

AFHRA List of Divisions